The 2022 British National Track Championships were a series of track cycling competitions. The National Track Championships (excluding certain events) were due to be held from 28 to 30 January 2022 at the Geraint Thomas National Velodrome in Newport, Wales. However, following further issues regarding the COVID-19 pandemic the event was rescheduled for 3 March to 6 March.

They are organised and sanctioned by British Cycling, and are open to British cyclists. The championships are sponsored by HSBC. 

The Derny, Omnium, Madison, Tandem and inaugural Elimination events took place at various other dates throughout the year.

Medal summary

Men

Women

Other events

Men

Women

Open

References

National Track Championships
British National Track Championships
British National Track